The Mausoleum of Pozo Moro is a Mausoleum of the Iberians from the end of the 6th century BC, which was discovered in 1970 in excavations made in the Province of Albacete.

Location 
Pozo Moro, near the Spanish community of Chinchilla de Monte-Aragón, lies about 840 m above sea level and 125 km from the Mediterranean coast at the intersection of important ancient roads. Here the road from Carthago Nova (Cartagena) to Complutum (Alcalá de Henares) and the central Spanish plateau met the Via Heraclea (also known as the Via Augusta), which ran down the Guadalquivir to Gades (Cádiz) and along the Spanish Levante.

Description 
The Mausoleum was found in pieces in an Iberian necropolis, strewn over a 12 x 12 m area and his since been reconstructed in the Museo Arqueológico Nacional de España in Madrid. The Mausoleum, which was erected by an Iberian king around 500 BC, is the oldest known Iberian grave monument. The find spots of the rectangular blocks enabled an accurate reconstruction of the structure, which must have been about 10 metres high and have stood atop a three-level square pedestal 3.65 m wide. Four stone lions stood on the corners of the mausoleum, whose walls were decorated with reliefs depicting deities. These sculptures belong to the orientalising phase of Iberian art and are heavily influenced by Hittite and Syrian art.

References

Bibliography 
 Martín Almagro-Gorbea: Pozo Moro. In: Michael Koch (Ed.): Die Iberer (Exhibition Catalogue). Hirmer, München 1998, pp. 148−149. 

Buildings and structures completed in the 6th century BC
Mausoleums in Spain
Iron Age Spain
Buildings and structures in Castilla–La Mancha
Collection of the National Archaeological Museum, Madrid
Iberians
Archaeological discoveries in Spain